Thaha Syaifuddin (1816–1904) became Sultan of Jambi in 1855. However, he refused to renew treaties imposed on his predecessors by the Dutch, who invaded Jambi in 1858 and imposed a series of sultans who, under Dutch control, reigned over much of the sultanate until 1899. Thaha, however, continued to claim the sultanate and to rule over its less accessible parts until he was killed by Dutch soldiers in 1904. In 1977, he was elevated to National Hero of Indonesia, the country's highest honor.

References

National Heroes of Indonesia
1816 births
1904 deaths